T.A.O is the first EP of the Chinese singer Z.Tao, released on July 23, 2015 by Huang Z.TAO Studio.

Background and release
In June 2015, it was reported that Tao had set up his own personal management agency in China to manage his solo activities, entitled Huang Z.TAO Studio. Tao revealed a mysterious teaser image through its official account on Weibo on July 9. It was revealed on July 13 that Tao officially launch their first mini-album.

The mini-album was released in China on July 23, 2015 where it sold over 670 000 within its first week.

Track listing

Sales

References

2015 debut EPs
Chinese-language EPs
Dance music EPs